Monique Angela Hicks (née Imes; born December 11, 1967), known professionally as Mo'Nique, is an American stand-up comedian and actress. She has received various accolades, including an Academy Award, BAFTA Award, Golden Globe Award, and Screen Actors Guild Award.

Mo'Nique first gained recognition for her work in stand-up comedy, debuting as a member of The Queens of Comedy. In 2002, she received a Grammy Award nomination for Best Comedy Album. She began her transition into mainstream film and television having a starring role as Nicole "Nikki" Parker in the UPN series The Parkers (1999–2004), as well as appearing in Phat Girlz (2006) and Welcome Home Roscoe Jenkins (2008).

In 2009, Mo'Nique garnered critical acclaim for her performance in the film Precious, for which she won numerous awards, including the Academy Award for Best Supporting Actress, becoming the fourth African-American woman to win the award. She has since hosted The Mo'Nique Show (2009–2011), and starred as Ma Rainey in the HBO biopic Bessie (2015) earning a Primetime Emmy Award nomination.

Early life
Mo'Nique was born on December 11, 1967, in Woodlawn, Baltimore County, Maryland, the daughter of engineer Alice Imes and drug counselor Steven Imes, Jr. She is the youngest of four children.  Mo'Nique graduated from Milford Mill High School in Baltimore County in 1985 and attended Morgan State University. She is a 1987 graduate of the Broadcasting Institute of Maryland.

Before she was an actress, Monique worked as a customer service representative at the phone company MCI in Hunt Valley, Maryland. She got her start in comedy at the downtown Baltimore Comedy Factory Outlet when her brother Steve dared her to perform at an open mic night.

During a 2008 Essence magazine interview, Mo'Nique revealed that she was sexually abused by her brother Gerald from ages 7–11; he went on to sexually abuse another girl and was sentenced to 12 years in prison. After her twin boys were born in 2005, Mo'Nique cut off all contact with Gerald. On April 19, 2010, he admitted on Oprah to sexually abusing her over several years. He also was abused by family members and struggled with substance abuse.

Career
Mo'Nique portrayed Nicole "Nikki" Parker on the UPN television series The Parkers from 1999 to 2004. She was featured on many leading stand-up venues such as Showtime at the Apollo, Russell Simmons' Def Comedy Jam, and Thank God You're Here. Mo'Nique tackles race issues in her stand up routines, for instance at the Montreal Just For Laugh Festival in 2000: "White and black people, we're just mad at each other, we don't know why we're mad at each other. We're not each other's enemy. We're not the enemy. It's the Chinese people we need to watch out for". 

In 2005, Mo'Nique played a significant role in Tony Scott's thriller Domino, co-starring Keira Knightley and Mickey Rourke. In 2006, Mo'Nique was cast as the lead in Phat Girlz, a comedy about an aspiring fashion designer struggling to find love and acceptance. The film was met with lukewarm response from critics and fans. It did earn back its $3 million production cost in its first weekend of release.

Mo'Nique's first play was Eve Ensler's Obie Award-winning production of The Vagina Monologues in March 2002. Mo'Nique, Ella Joyce (Roc); Wendy Raquel Robinson (The Steve Harvey Show and The Game) and Vanessa Bell Calloway (What's Love Got to Do with It), were the first all black celebrity cast to perform The Vagina Monologues. Produced by YYP & Associates, the show was directed by playwright and director Yetta Young as well as co-produced by Kellie R. Griffin, Lisa D. Washington and Anita Cal. Mo'Nique is the author of the best-selling book Skinny Women Are Evil: Notes of a Bigg Girl in a Small-Minded World. She also released a 2006 cookbook called Skinny Cooks Can't Be Trusted. Mo'nique was part of the Washington, D.C., WHUR radio show with George Wilborn. In 2006, she occasionally filled in for afternoon personality Michael Baisden when his contract with ABC Radio was in the process of getting renewed.

She was also named hostess of Showtime at the Apollo. She was the hostess and executive producer of Mo'Nique's Fat Chance, a beauty pageant for plus-sized women, on the Oxygen cable network. She hosted the first season of Flavor of Love Girls: Charm School on VH1 where she crowned Saaphyri as the winner.
Mo'Nique's 2007 documentary I Coulda Been Your Cellmate! focuses on incarcerated women. In interviews with individual women, she touches on the common factors that bring many women into the penal system. The documentary was related to her filming a comedy special at the Ohio Reformatory for Women, also known as The Farm. In 2007, she had a guest-starring role on the hit television series Ugly Betty as L'Amanda, Mode's weekend security guard. She starred in The Mo'Nique Show, her own late-night talk show. Taped in Atlanta, the show premiered October 5, 2009, on BET.

She was featured in soul singer Anthony Hamilton's video "Sista Big Bones", the second single from his album Ain't Nobody Worryin'. She hosted the 2003 and 2004 BET Awards and appeared as the host again for the 2007 BET Awards. She received positive responses in July 2004 with her opening performance of Beyoncé's single "Crazy in Love" In 2007, she performed Beyoncé's "Déjà Vu". Mo'Nique has had a number of supporting roles in film. She appeared in the 2008 comedy film, Welcome Home Roscoe Jenkins with Martin Lawrence. She has had roles in Beerfest,  3 Strikes, Two Can Play That Game, Half Past Dead, and Soul Plane. She voiced a character in Garfield: The Movie, but her role was cut from the movie.

In 2008, Mo'Nique stated on Oprah Winfrey Show that Martin Lawrence gave her invaluable advice about show business: "He pulled me to the side and he said, 'Listen, don't ever let them tell you what you can't have.' Since that day, I've made some of the best deals I've ever made in my career because it keeps ringing in my head...It will stay with me forever." In 2008, Radio One signed her to her own radio show: Mo'Nique in the Afternoon (or The Mo'Nique Show), which premiered on several Radio One-owned Urban Adult Contemporary-formatted R&B/soul radio stations in July 2008. It mainly aired on these stations that had a local lineup because some Radio One stations did not carry it due to their contracts with Michael Baisden. The show lasted until March 18, 2009, when Mo'Nique decided to leave to "further her career in television, film, and comedy."

In 2009, Mo'Nique appeared in the film Precious, directed by Lee Daniels, portraying an inner-city teenager's abusive mother. She won the Sundance Film Festival Special Jury Prize for her performance in the film. The African-American Film Critics Association (AAFCA) awarded Mo'Nique with the Best Supporting Actress Award in December 2009. Mo'Nique received the AAFCA's first ever unanimous vote in an acting category.

She has received Best Supporting Actress awards from the Stockholm International Film Festival, the Washington DC Area Film Critics Association, the Los Angeles Film Critics Association, the Boston Society of Film Critics, the New York Film Critics Online, the New York Film Critics Circle, the Southeastern Film Critics Association, the San Francisco Film Critics Circle, the Dallas-Fort Worth Film Critics Association, the Las Vegas Film Critics Society, the Utah Film Critics Association, the Detroit Film Critics Society, the Indiana Film Critics Association, the Online Film Critics Society, the National Society of Film Critics Awards, the Alliance of Women Film Journalists, and the Critics Choice Awards. Time magazine ranked Mo'Nique's outstanding performance as the Best Female Performance of 2009. She won the Academy Award for Best Supporting Actress, the Independent Spirit Award, and the BAFTA Award.

In November 2009, Mo'Nique said, "I own the rights to Hattie McDaniel's life story, and I can't wait to tell that story because that woman was absolutely amazing. She had to stand up to the adversity of black and white [society] at a time when we really weren't accepted. Mr. Lee Daniels is going to direct it, of course, and I'm going to be Miss Hattie McDaniel. I really hope I can do that woman justice." 

In 2014, Mo'Nique starred in Patrik-Ian Polk's drama film Blackbird as Claire Rousseau. She next starred as Ma Rainey in the biographical film Bessie in 2015, for which she received critical acclaim, earning her a Primetime Emmy Award nomination. Her last role (in film or television) was in 2016. In May 2017, she said Lee Daniels, Oprah Winfrey, and Tyler Perry had been blackballing her ever since she did not promote Precious in 2009.

In 2022, it was announced that Mo'Nique will be starring in the Lee Daniels' horror/thriller The Deliverance with Andra Day, Omar Epps, Miss Lawrence, and Tasha Smith.

Personal life
Mo'Nique was briefly engaged to accountant Kenny Mung. From 1997 to 2001, she was married to Mark Jackson. They have two sons: Mark Eric Jackson Jr. and Shalon Calvin Jackson. Mo'Nique gave birth to twin sons Jonathan and David Hicks in October 2005, two months early. In 2006, she married their father Sidney Hicks. In a New York Times profile, she mentions that she and Hicks have an open marriage:

She repeated this view later on The Oprah Winfrey Show when she said that, in her prior marriages, she was constantly searching for "that extra oomph". Mo'Nique explained,

When I said I had an open marriage, people automatically jumped to sex. They automatically went there. But I've been best friends with my husband since we were 14 years old. When we say open, we're very honest. There are no secrets. Oftentimes you have people that are married, but they're strangers, and we refuse to be those people.

She concluded, "I've had to sneak and I've had to lie, and I don't want to do that anymore. But my husband is so awesome and so fine and so—oh, girl...No other man can compare".

Filmography

Film

Television

Residency show 
 2019: Mo'Nique Does Vegas

Controversy

2009 awards campaign 
In 2009, Mo'Nique starred in the independent drama Precious: Based on the Novel 'Push' by Sapphire directed by Lee Daniels. For the role, she was paid $50,000. The film started to receive critical attention and awards buzz for her performance. The film's executive producers Tyler Perry and Oprah Winfrey as well as the film's production company Lionsgate asked her to travel to promote the film at the Cannes Film Festival, which she declined to do, saying her deal was with the film's director, Daniels, and that she had finished her contractual obligations. 

Upon winning the Academy Award for Best Supporting Actress, Mo'Nique stated, "I'd like to thank the Academy for showing that it can be about the performance and not the politics". 

Mo'Nique has since claimed Tyler Perry called her to apologize for how she was treated. In 2020, Mo'Nique performed a standup segment attacking Perry, Oprah, and others involved in the feud. She has stated how devastated she was by Oprah's communication and described her as "malicious."

2019 Netflix lawsuit 
In 2018, Mo'Nique accused Netflix of racial and gender bias against her after she was paid $500,000 for her comedy special to air on the streaming service. She compared herself to Dave Chappelle, Chris Rock, Kevin Hart, and Amy Schumer, who each received multimillion-dollar deals. In her statement, she stated: 

In her statement, she also urged people to support her in her boycott of Netflix. She went on numerous talk shows, including The View, in which she continued to fight against Netflix. In 2019, she sued Netflix, with her complaint reading in part, "In short, as this lawsuit shows, Netflix’s treatment of Mo’Nique began with a discriminatory low-ball offer and ended with a blacklisting act of retaliation."  In the suit, she listed fellow comedians who were paid millions for their specials, including Chappelle, Rock, Jerry Seinfeld, Eddie Murphy, Ellen DeGeneres, and Ricky Gervais.

By June 2022, Netflix had settled the lawsuit with Mo’Nique, and on July 19, 2022 announced that she was set to do a new special for them.

Awards and nominations

Mo'nique is the recipient of numerous accolades, most notably, for her performance in Precious, winning a total of 52 awards out of 66 nominations; in particular, the Academy Award for Best Supporting Actress, BAFTA Award for Best Actress in a Supporting Role, and, the Golden Globe Award for Best Supporting Actress – Motion Picture.

For her performance in The Parkers, Mo'nique has received four NAACP Image Awards in the category of Most Outstanding Actress in a Comedy Series. She has also been nominated for several roles, including, a Primetime Emmy Award for her work in the television film, Bessie, and a number of BET Awards for her contribution to comedy productions.

References

External links

1967 births
Living people
20th-century American actresses
21st-century American actresses
20th-century American comedians
21st-century American comedians
Actresses from Baltimore
African-American actresses
African-American female comedians
African-American stand-up comedians
African-American television producers
American film actresses
American stand-up comedians
American television actresses
American television producers
American voice actresses
American women comedians
American women film producers
American women television producers
Best Supporting Actress BAFTA Award winners
Best Supporting Actress Golden Globe (film) winners
Best Supporting Actress Academy Award winners
Broadcasting Institute of Maryland alumni
Independent Spirit Award for Best Supporting Female winners
Late night television talk show hosts
Morgan State University alumni
Participants in American reality television series
Outstanding Performance by a Female Actor in a Supporting Role Screen Actors Guild Award winners
20th-century African-American women
20th-century African-American people
21st-century African-American women
21st-century African-American people